Ann Jemima Allebach (May 8, 1874 – April 27, 1918) was an American minister, educator and suffragette. She was the first woman ordained as a Mennonite minister in North America, on January 15, 1911.  There was not another Mennonite woman ordained until 1973.

Allebach was the first woman ever chosen from Kings County, New York, to be a delegate to a national political convention. She was chosen for the 1912 Republican National Convention held in Chicago but was not allowed to attend. She was a delegate from the Eighteenth Assembly District of the State Convention of the Progressive Party at Syracuse.

Early life and education 
Ann Jemima Allebach was born on May 8, 1874 in Montgomery County, Pennsylvania, and grew up near Schwenksville. Her parents were Sarah Markley Allebach and Jacob R. Allebach, who was a banker and postmaster. As a child, she founded a chapter of Young People's Society of Christian Endeavour in her hometown. In 1893, she became a principal of a school in East Orange, New Jersey, and began her college studies. She studied at Ursinus College, New York University, Columbia University, and Union Theological Seminary.

Career
Following her studies, she taught at Perkiomen Seminary in Pennsburg, Pennsylvania.

Ordination
She requested ordination from the minister of her home church and a minister in Philadelphia. They agreed to her request, though the culture in that part of Pennsylvania would remain generally opposed to women ministers for several decades. She was ordained on 15 January 1911 at the First Mennonite Church in Philadelphia. Following her ordination, she returned to New York City, living in Brooklyn.

In June 1913 she said:—

Right to preach and suffrage
After returning to New York City, she spoke out about women's right to preach, and was also outspoken in supporting women's right to vote. In Brooklyn, she preached at the Marcy Avenue Baptist Church from 1913–1915. She also ministered to the poor, and was asked by the Mayor of New York to organize a conference on home religion and social services. She was frequently invited back to Pennsylvania to preach.  In 1916, she was called to be the minister for the Sunnyside Reformed Church on Long Island.

Death and legacy
On April 27, 1918, she died of a heart attack. She was the first ordained female Mennonite minister in North America.

References

Citations

Bibliography 

 

1874 births
1918 deaths
20th-century Anabaptist ministers
Women Christian clergy
Ursinus College alumni
New York University alumni
Mennonite ministers
American suffragists
American Mennonites
People from Montgomery County, Pennsylvania
Clergy from New York City
People from Brooklyn
Union Theological Seminary (New York City) alumni